The Misaki worm eel (Scolecenchelys aoki) is an eel in the family Ophichthidae (worm/snake eels). It was described by David Starr Jordan and John Otterbein Snyder in 1901, originally under the genus Muraenichthys. It is a marine, temperate water-dwelling eel which is known from reefs in Japan, in the northwestern Pacific Ocean.

References

Taxa named by David Starr Jordan
Taxa named by John Otterbein Snyder
Fish described in 1901
Scolecenchelys